One Foot in Hell is the third studio album by the American heavy metal band Cirith Ungol. The original LP was produced by Brian Slagel and Cirith Ungol. It was released in August 1986 on Metal Blade Records and re-released in March 1999 by Metal Blade Records on CD. Greg Lindstrom said in an interview:
It's an excellent album although I thought the songs overall were not as strong as King of the Dead, and Flint's bass seems to have gotten lost in the mix.

The song "Nadsokor" was covered by the Italian epic doom metal band Doomsword.

Track listing 
All songs by Cirith Ungol, except where indicated.

"Blood & Iron" – 3:52
"Chaos Descends" – 4:55
"The Fire" – 3:37
"Nadsokor" – 4:43
"100 MPH" (Cirith Ungol, Greg Lindstrom) – 3:26
"War Eternal" – 5:12
"Doomed Planet" – 4:38
"One Foot in Hell" – 5:10

Personnel 
Tim Baker – vocals
Jerry Fogle – guitars
Michael Vujea – bass
Robert Garven – drums

References 

1986 albums
Cirith Ungol albums
Metal Blade Records albums
Albums with cover art by Michael Whelan